Banville can refer to:

Places
Banville, Calvados, a commune in the Calvados department of the Normandy region of north-western France
Charles-B.-Banville Ecological Reserve, a nature reserve in Quebec, Canada

People
John Banville, an Irish novelist.
Melanie Louise Banville, a Canadian gymnast.
Théodore de Banville, a French poet and writer.